Syderstone Common is a  biological Site of Special Scientific Interest west of Fakenham in Norfolk.

The common has heath and grassland areas in the valley of the River Tat. Pools on sand and gravel provide suitable habitats for five species of breeding amphibians, including the nationally rare natterjack toad.

The site is open to the public.

References

Norfolk Wildlife Trust
Sites of Special Scientific Interest in Norfolk